Vadillo de la Guareña is a municipality located in the province of Zamora, Castile and León, Spain.

References 

Municipalities of the Province of Zamora